BC Ežerūnas-Atletas is a professional Molėtai, Lithuania basketball club, currently playing in National Basketball League.

Club achievements 
 2011-2012 season: NKL 13th place
 2012-2013 season: NKL 15th place
 2013-2014 season: NKL 3rd place
 2014-2015 season: NKL 2nd place
 2015-2016 season: NKL 13th place
 2016-2017 season: NKL 13th place
 2017-2018 season: NKL 7th place
 2018-2019 season: NKL 11th place

Current roster

Notable players and coaches 
  Gintautas Matulis
  Saulius Kuzminskas
  Andrius Šležas
  Kęstutis Šeštokas
  Evaldas Baniulis
  Žygimantas Šeštokas
  Thomas Ray Davis
  Karolis Lukošiūnas
  Dovydas Giedraitis

External links 

Moletai
Sport in Molėtai
Basketball teams established in 2009
2009 establishments in Lithuania
National Basketball League (Lithuania) teams